Lymantria is a genus of tussock moths in the family Erebidae. They are widely distributed throughout Europe, Japan, India, Sri Lanka, Myanmar, Java, and Celebes. The genus was erected by Jacob Hübner in 1819.

Description
In the male, the palpi are porrect (extending forward) and hairy. Antennae with long branches. Forewings with veins 3, 4 and 5 from close to angle of cell. Vein 6 from below upper angle. Veins 7 to 10 are stalked, where vein 7 being given off further from the cell than vein 10. Hindwings with veins 3, 4 and 5 from close to angle of cell. Vein 6 and 7 from upper angle. In female, antennae serrate (tooth like on one side). Wings either fully developed or partially reduced or completely reduced to scales.

Species
The following species are included in the genus.

Lymantria aboleta Staudinger, 1896
Lymantria akemii Schintlmeister, 189?
Lymantria albescens Matsumura, 1927
Lymantria albimacula Wallengren, 1863
Lymantria albolunulata Moore, 1879
Lymantria alexandrae Schintlmeister, 1994
Lymantria ampla Walker, 1855
Lymantria antennata Walker, 1855
Lymantria antica Walker, 1856
Lymantria aomoriensis Matsumura, 1921
Lymantria apicebrunnea Gaede, 1932
Lymantria arete Fawcett, 1915
Lymantria argyrochroa Collenette, 1935
Lymantria arrheta Collenette, 1959
Lymantria aryama Moore, 1859
Lymantria ascetria Hübner, 1821
Lymantria asiatica Vunkovskij, 1926
Lymantria atala C. Swinhoe, 1923
Lymantria atemeles Collenette, 1932
Lymantria atlantica Rambur, 1842
Lymantria atra Linstow., 1907
Lymantria aurora Butler, 1877
Lymantria bantaizana Matsumura, 1933
Lymantria barica Mabille, 1878
Lymantria barisana Collenette, 1933
Lymantria barlowi Schintlmeister, 1994
Lymantria beatrix Stoll, 1790
Lymantria bhascara Moore, 1859
Lymantria binotata Mabille, 1880
Lymantria bisextilis Toxopeus, 1948
Lymantria bivittata Moore, 1879
Lymantria brotea Stoll, 1780
Lymantria brunneata Kenrick, 1914
Lymantria brunneiplaga C. Swinhoe, 1903
Lymantria brunneoloma Pogue & Schaeffer, 2007
Lymantria buruensis Collenette, 1933
Lymantria caliginosa Collenette, 1933
Lymantria canariensis Kenrick, 1914
Lymantria capnodes Collenette, 1932
Lymantria carnecolor Moore, 1888
Lymantria carneola Moore, 1879
Lymantria castanea Kenrick, 1914
Lymantria castaneostriata Kenrick, 1914
Lymantria ceballosi Agenjo, 1959
Lymantria celebesa Collenette, 1947
Lymantria chosenibia Bryk, 1949
Lymantria chroma Collenette, 1947
Lymantria concolor Walker, 1855
Lymantria conspersa Hering, 1927
Lymantria costalis Walker, 1865
Lymantria cryptocloea Collenette, 1932
Lymantria curvifera Walker, 1866
Lymantria daraba Wiltshire, 1952
Lymantria demotes Collenette,
Lymantria destituta Staudinger, 1891
Lymantria detersa Walker, 1865
Lymantria dictyodigma Collenette, 1930
Lymantria didymata Kenrick, 1914
Lymantria diehli Schintlmeister, 198?
Lymantria dispar Linnaeus, 1758 – gypsy moth
Lymantria disparina Hering, 1926
Lymantria dissoluta C. Swinhoe, 1903
Lymantria diversa Turner, 1936
Lymantria doreyensis Collenette, 1933
Lymantria dubia Kenrick, 1914
Lymantria dubiosa Aurivillius, 1894
Lymantria dulcinea Butler, 1882
Lymantria ekeikei Bethune-Baker, 1904
Lymantria elassa Collenette, 1938
Lymantria epelytes Collenette, 1936
Lymantria eremita Ochsenheimer, 1810
Lymantria faircloughi Holloway, 1999
Lymantria finitorum Collenette, 1931
Lymantria flavicilia Hampson, 1910
Lymantria flavoneura Joicey, 1916
Lymantria formosana Matsumura, 1911
Lymantria fuliginea Butler, 1880
Lymantria fuliginosa Moore, 1883
Lymantria fumida Butler, 1877
Lymantria fumosa Saalmüller, 1884
Lymantria fusca Leech, 1888
Lymantria galinaria C. Swinhoe, 1903
Lymantria ganaha C. Swinhoe, 1903
Lymantria ganara Moore, 1859
Lymantria ganaroides Strand, 1917
Lymantria grandis Walker, 1855
Lymantria grisea Moore, 1879
Lymantria griseipennis Kozhanchikov, 1950
Lymantria griseostriata Kenrick, 1914
Lymantria grisescens Staudinger, 1887
Lymantria hadina Butler, 1881
Lymantria harimuda Roepke, 1937
Lymantria hemipyra Collenette, 1932
Lymantria hilaris Voll., 1863
Lymantria hollowayi Schintlmeister, 198?
Lymantria horishana Matsumura, 1931
Lymantria horishanella Matsumura, 1927
Lymantria hypobolimaea Collenette, 1959
Lymantria ichorina Butler, 1884
Lymantria idea Bryk, 1949
Lymantria incerta Walker, 1855
Lymantria infuscata Okano, 1959
Lymantria inordinata Walker, 1865
Lymantria iris Strand, 1910
Lymantria japonica Motschulsky, 1860
Lymantria joannisi Le Cerf, 1921
Lymantria kanara Collenette, 1951
Lymantria kebeae Bethune-Baker, 1904
Lymantria kettlewelli Collenette, 1953
Lymantria kinta Collenette, 1932
Lymantria kobesi Schintlmeister, 1994
Lymantria kolthoffi Bryk, 1949
Lymantria komarovi Christoph, 1882
Lymantria koreibia Bryk, 1949
Lymantria kosemponis Strand, 1914
Lymantria kruegeri Turati, 1912
Lymantria lacteipennis Collenette, 1933
Lymantria lamda Collenette, 1936
Lymantria lapidicola Herrich-Schäffer, 1852
Lymantria lateralis Bryk, 1949
Lymantria lepcha Moore, 1879
Lymantria leucerythra Collenette, 1930
Lymantria leucophaes Collenette, 1936
Lymantria libella C. Swinhoe, 1904
Lymantria loacana Semper, 1898
Lymantria lucescens Butler, 1881
Lymantria lunata Stoll, 1781
Lymantria lutea Boisduval, 1847
Lymantria lutescens Aurivillius, 1920
Lymantria lygaea Bethune-Baker, 1908
Lymantria maculata Semper, 1898
Lymantria maculosa Walker, 1855
Lymantria malgassica Kenrick, 1914
Lymantria marginalis Walker, 1862
Lymantria marginata Walker, 1855
Lymantria marwitzi Grumb., 1907
Lymantria mathura Moore, 1865
Lymantria matuta Bryk, 1949
Lymantria maura Oberthür, 1916
Lymantria melanopogon Strand, 1914
Lymantria metarhoda Walker, 1862
Lymantria metella Fawcett, 1915
Lymantria micans Felder, 1874
Lymantria microcyma Collenette, 1937
Lymantria microstrigata Holloway, 1999
Lymantria minahassa Collenette, 1932
Lymantria miniata Grunb., 1907
Lymantria minomonis Matsumura, 1933
Lymantria minora van Eecke, 1828
Lymantria mjobergi Aurivillius, 1920
Lymantria modesta Walker, 1855
Lymantria moesta C. Swinhoe, 1903
Lymantria monacha Linnaeus, 1758
Lymantria monoides Collenette, 1932
Lymantria mosera H. Druce, 1898
Lymantria mus Oberthür, 1916
Lymantria narindra Moore, 1859
Lymantria nebulosa Wileman, 1910
Lymantria neirai Agenjo, 1959
Lymantria nephrographa Turner, 1915
Lymantria nesiobia Bryk, 1942
Lymantria nigra Freyer, 1833
Lymantria nigra Moore, 1888
Lymantria nigricosta Matsumura, 1921
Lymantria ninayi Bethune-Baker, 1910
Lymantria nobunaga Nagano, 1909
Lymantria novaguinensis Bethune-Baker, 1904
Lymantria nudala Strand, 1915
Lymantria oberthuri D. Lucas, 1906
Lymantria obfuscata Walker, 1865
Lymantria obsoleta Walker, 1855
Lymantria oinoa Collenette, 1956
Lymantria orestera Collenette, 1932
Lymantria ornata Oberthür, 1923
Lymantria ossea Toxopeus, 1948
Lymantria pagon Holloway, 1999
Lymantria panthera van Eecke, 1928
Lymantria pelospila Turner, 1915
Lymantria pendleburyi Collenette, 1932
Lymantria phaeosericea Mabille, 1884
Lymantria plumbalis Hampson, 1895
Lymantria polioptera Collenette, 1934
Lymantria polycyma Collenette, 1936
Lymantria polysticta Collenette, 1929
Lymantria postalba Inoue, 1956
Lymantria postfusca C. Swinhoe, 1906
Lymantria praetermissa Collenette, 1933
Lymantria pramesta Moore, 1859
Lymantria pruinosa Butler, 1879
Lymantria pruinosa Hering, 1927
Lymantria pulverea Pogue & Schaeffer, 2007
Lymantria pusilla Felder, 1874
Lymantria rhabdota Collenette, 1949
Lymantria rhodina Walker, 1865
Lymantria rhodopepla Felder, 1874
Lymantria rosea Butler, 1879
Lymantria roseicoxa Kenrick, 1914
Lymantria roseola Matsumura, 1931
Lymantria rosina Pagenstecher, 1900
Lymantria rubroviridis Hering, 1917
Lymantria rufofusca Mabille, 1899
Lymantria rufotincta Kenrick, 1914
Lymantria russula Collenette, 1933
Lymantria rusticana Hering, 1927
Lymantria sakaguchii Matsumura, 1927
Lymantria semicincta Walker, 1855
Lymantria serva Fabricius, 1793
Lymantria servula Collenette, 1935
Lymantria sinica Moore, 1879
Lymantria subfusca Schulz., 1910
Lymantria subpallida Okano, 1959
Lymantria subrosea Walker, 1855
Lymantria sugii Kishida, 1986
Lymantria superans Walker, 1855
Lymantria takasagonis Matsumura, 1933
Lymantria todara Moore, 1879
Lymantria tsushimensis Inoue, 1956
Lymantria umbrifera Wileman, 1910
Lymantria umbrina Moore, 1879
Lymantria umbrosa Butler, 1881
Lymantria uxor Saalmüller, 1884
Lymantria variegata Kenrick, 1914
Lymantria vinacea Moore, 1879
Lymantria xylina C. Swinhoe, 1903
Lymantria yunnanensis Collenette, 1933

References 

 Ingram, R. (2010): Gypsy Moths (Lymantria spp.) Surveillance in Australia. DAFF mimeograph.
 Pogue, Michael G. & Schaefer, Paul W. (2007): A Review of Selected Species of Lymantria Hübner, [1819] (Lepidoptera: Lymantriidae) from Subtropical and Temperate Regions of Asia, Including the Descriptions of Three New Species, Some Potentially Invasive to North America.
 Schintlmeister, Alexander (2004). The Taxonomy of the Genus Lymantria Hübner, [1819] (Lepidoptera: Lymantriidae).

External links
 
 
 "Lymantria Hübner, 1819". Fauna Europaea. Retrieved March 24, 2020.
 
 
 

 
Lymantriini
Moth genera
Taxa named by Jacob Hübner